The 2020 UEFA European Under-19 Championship (also known as UEFA Under-19 Euro 2020) was scheduled to be the 19th edition of the UEFA European Under-19 Championship (69th edition if the Under-18 and Junior eras are included), the annual international youth football championship organised by UEFA for the men's under-19 national teams of Europe. Due to the COVID-19 pandemic, the tournament was initially postponed, rescheduled and was cancelled in October 2020.

Northern Ireland, which last hosted the tournament in 2005, was selected as host by UEFA on 9 December 2016.

As in previous editions held in even-numbered years, the tournament was due to act as the UEFA qualifiers for the FIFA U-20 World Cup. The top five teams of the tournament were to qualify for the 2021 FIFA U-20 World Cup in Indonesia as the UEFA representatives. Following the cancellation of the tournament, UEFA instead nominated the top five ranked countries in the qualifying round coefficient ranking.

Postponements and eventual cancellation
The final tournament was originally scheduled to be played between 19 July – 1 August 2020. Due to the COVID-19 pandemic, UEFA announced on 1 April 2020 that the tournament had been postponed until further notice. On 17 June 2020, UEFA announced that the final tournament had been rescheduled and would be played in two periods, with the group stage played between 7–14 October 2020, and the knockout stage, which would consist of the semi-finals, the FIFA U-20 World Cup play-off and the final, played between 11 and 14 November 2020.

UEFA then announced on 13 August 2020 that after consultation with the 55 member associations, the final tournament had been further postponed, with the group stage played in November 2020 and the knockout stage played in March 2021. On 16 September 2020, UEFA announced that the tournament would be played in March 2021 in straight knock-out format, consisting of the quarter-finals, semi-finals, final, and play-off matches to decide the fifth team to qualify for the FIFA U-20 World Cup.

Finally, the tournament was cancelled by UEFA on 20 October 2020.

Qualification

A total of 54 UEFA nations entered the competition. The hosts Northern Ireland would have qualified automatically, with the other 53 teams competing in the qualifying competition.

Venues
The tournament was due to be held in four venues:

References

External links

Under-19 Matches: 2020, UEFA.com

 
2020
Under-19 Championship
2020 in youth association football
2021 FIFA U-20 World Cup qualification
Association football events cancelled due to the COVID-19 pandemic